Catherine Margaret Branson  (born 2 May 1948) is a former Australian judge and public servant.  She was a judge of the Federal Court of Australia from 1994 to 2008, and then President of the Australian Human Rights Commission from 2008 to 2012.

Early life and education 
Branson is the daughter of Max and Barbara Rayner and grew up on a wheat and sheep property near Hallett, South Australia and learned to drive every vehicle including tractors. She went to school at Presbyterian Girls' College before studying at the University of Adelaide. She initially sought to study psychology, but the pathway to that at the time was law or economics. She graduated with a Bachelor of Laws and then a Bachelor of Arts.

Career
In her early twenties, Branson volunteered at a legal aid office near Michigan during an extended trip to the United States. On return to South Australia, Branson initially worked in private practice, then at the South Australian Department of Legal Services in 1977 before moving to the Crown Solicitor's Office in 1978. She was Crown Solicitor of South Australia from 1984-1989, the first woman to be appointed in Australia. Branson had a dual appointment as the Chief Executive officer of the South Australian Attorney-General’s Department, the first woman to be the permanent head of a South Australian government department.

Branson practised as a barrister at the South Australian Bar from 1989, practising principally in the areas of administrative and commercial law.  Branson was appointed Queen's Counsel in 1992.

Federal Court
In 1994 Branson was appointed a judge of the Federal Court in 1994. Branson was a member of the full court considering an appeal by the Yorta Yorta people concerning their native title claim. Branson was a member of the majority that upheld Justice Olney's finding that the 'tide of history' had 'washed away' any real acknowledgement of traditional laws and any real observance of traditional customs by the Yorta Yorta community. Another high profile case in which Branson was a judge on the full court that unanimously dismissed an appeal by The Wilderness Society concerning approval of the Gunns pulp mill in Tasmania.

Branson was the President of the Australian Institute for Judicial Administration from 1998 to 2000.

Branson retired from the Federal Court in 2008.

Australian Human Rights Commission
Branson was the president of the Australian Human Rights Commission from 2008 until 2012. During her time as president Branson supported a federal charter of human rights, same-sex marriage and opposed mandatory detention for asylum seekers. Branson continued to live in Adelaide, however she had to commute regularly to Sydney and decided to resign 15 months early to spend more time with her husband and elderly parents.

Honours
In 2012 Branson was given an honorary Doctor of Laws by Flinders University, for her 'long and esteemed career in the law' and an Honorary Doctorate of Letters from Macquarie University for her support and advocacy for human rights.

In 2018, she was invested as a Companion of the Order of Australia (AC) in the Queen's Birthday Honours.

In July 2020, Branson was appointed Chancellor of The University of Adelaide.

References

 

1948 births
Living people
Australian King's Counsel
Judges of the Federal Court of Australia
Australian women judges
Adelaide Law School alumni
Academic staff of the University of Adelaide
Companions of the Order of Australia